Quiet Victory: The Charlie Wedemeyer Story is a 1988 American television film directed by Roy Campanella II and starring Michael Nouri as Charlie Wedemeyer and Pam Dawber as his wife Lucy.

Cast
Pam Dawber as Lucy Wedemeyer (except last scene fadeover from Dawber to actual Lucy)
Michael Nouri as Charlie Wedemeyer (except last scene fadeover from Nouri to actual Charlie)
Peter Berg as Bobby Maker
James Handy as Charlie's Doctor
Reginald VelJohnson as Assistant Coach
Noble Willingham as Ted Simonsen
Stephen Dorff as Older Kale Wedemeyer 
Kyle Chandler as Skinner

References

External links
 
 

Films scored by Don Davis (composer)
American biographical films
Films set in the 20th century
CBS network films
1988 films
1988 television films
1980s biographical films
1980s English-language films
1980s American films